Brian Dabul and Ramón Delgado were the defending champions. Delgado chose to not participate this year. Delgado partnered up by Sebastián Decoud, however they lost to Santiago González and Jean-Julien Rojer.
Sebastián Prieto and Horacio Zeballos won in the final 7–6(5), 6–4, against Alexander Peya and Fernando Vicente.

Seeds

Draw

Draw

External links
 Main Draw

Bancolombia Open - Doubles
Bancolombia Open